Elitzur Yavne is a basketball team based in Yavne, Israel. The team plays in Israeli National League, the second division basketball league in Israel, having been promoted from Liga Arzit (third division) at the end of the 2006–07 season. In 2005–06 and 2006–07, the team won the Igud Cup.

The club runs a youth department with six teams, where NBA player Omri Casspi started out. The team hosts their games in the "Shabazi Hall", with 600 seats, in Yavne.

Honors
Igud Cup:
Winners (2): 2005–06, 2006–07

Current roster

Notable players
 Omri Casspi
/ Alon Stein
 Ray Willis

Basketball teams in Israel
Basketball teams established in 1991
Liga Leumit (basketball) teams
1991 establishments in Israel
Sport in Yavne